Jovica Veljović (born 1954) is a Serbian type designer and calligrapher. He is professor for type design at the Hamburg University of Applied Sciences.

In 1985, Veljović was awarded the Prix Charles Peignot, an infrequently awarded prize for type design.

His designs include ITC Veljović and Espirit for ITC, Sava, Silentium and Ex Ponto for Adobe, and Libelle, Veljović Script and Agmena for Linotype. He also has worked as a consultant to URW.

References

External links
 Linotype website
 Type designer Jovica Veljović (Adobe website)
 Calligraphy class

Living people
Serbian emigrants to Germany
German typographers and type designers
1954 births